Alexandre Joseph Célestin Gendebien (Mons, 4 May 1789 – Brussels, 6 December 1869) was a lawyer in the United Kingdom of the Netherlands and later Belgium, where he also became minister of Justice.

He played an important role during the Belgian Revolution, together with his colleague Sylvain Van de Weyer. He was a proponent of Belgian union with France, and adversary of William I of the Netherlands.

References 
  80 pages.

Members of the National Congress of Belgium
1789 births
1869 deaths
People from Mons
Belgian Ministers of Justice